is a Japanese women's football team which plays Japan Women's Football League from 2010.

See also
List of women's football clubs in Japan

References

External links
Official site 

Women's football clubs in Japan